The New Zealand Cat Fancy (NZCF) is a cat registry in New Zealand. It is a member of the World Cat Congress and has 21 affiliated clubs. 

The NZCF lists 55 breeds of purebred cat on its website. It promotes cat shows and holds an annual national cat show. It was the first cat registry to admit polydactyl Maine Coons to competition, in December 2008. The NZCF also publishes a quarterly magazine called Flash Cats.

See also
 List of cat registries

References

External links

Organisations based in New Zealand
Cat fancy
Cat registries